Whitechapel is the fourth studio album by American deathcore band Whitechapel. It was released worldwide on June 19, 2012, through Metal Blade Records. This is the first album to feature drummer Ben Harclerode. The album cover is an image of the Flag of Tennessee (paying homage to the band's home state) inside of the band's trademark saw blade.

History and background 
On April 30, Whitechapel announced that their fourth album will be self-titled and was released on June 19, 2012. They released a new song, "Hate Creation", the same day. On May 29, the song "I, Dementia" was released.

Track listing

Credits 
Production and performance credits are adapted from the album liner notes.

Personnel 
Whitechapel
 Phil Bozeman – vocals
 Ben Savage – lead guitar
 Alex Wade – rhythm guitar
 Zach Householder – third guitar
 Gabe Crisp – bass
 Ben Harclerode – drums

Additional musicians
 Ben Eller – guitar solo on "I, Dementia", "Faces"

Production
 Mark Lewis – engineering, mixing, production
 Whitechapel – production
 Eyal Levi – drum assistant, additional engineering, mix engineering
 Jarret Prichard – drum tech
 Nate Carpenter – drum tech
 John Douglass – additional engineering
 Alan Douches – mastering

Artwork and design
 Aaron Marsh – artwork
 Whitechapel – art direction
 Adam Zlmakias – photography

Studios 
 Audiohammer, Sanford, FL, US – recording (drums), mixing
 Wade Studios, Louisville, TN, US – recording (guitars, bass, vocals)
 West West Side Music – mastering

Charts

References

External links 
 
 This Is Exile at Metal Blade
 This Is Exile at Whitechapel's official website

2012 albums
Albums produced by Mark Lewis (music producer)
Metal Blade Records albums
Whitechapel (band) albums